HK Vitez is an ice hockey team in Belgrade, Serbia. They play in the Serbian Hockey League, the top level of ice hockey in Serbia. Vitez plays its home games at Pingvin Hall.

History
The club was founded in 2001. They finished in second place to HK Partizan in the Serbian Hockey League in the 2011-12 and 2012-13 seasons. 

Vitez took part in the 2012–13 IIHF Continental Cup, finishing in third place in Group A after defeating Maccabi Metulla and losing to Başkent Yıldızları and HSC Csíkszereda.

Honours

Serbian Hockey League:
Runners-up (2): 2012, 2013

External links
 Official website
 Team profile on eurohockey.com

Ice hockey teams in Serbia
Sport in Belgrade
Serbian Hockey League teams
New Belgrade